Olivier Mony (born 27 October 1966, Bordeaux) is a French writer and journalist.

Publications 
2007: Un dimanche avec Garbo, et autres histoires, 
2007: Du beau monde, éd. Le Festin
2008: Objets et saveurs du Pays basque, éd. Confluences

External links 
 Olivier Mony on France Culture
 Trois raisons de découvrir Olivier Mony on Le Point (11 August 2011)
 Anecdotes et fugues mélancoliques du chroniqueur Olivier Mony on L'Express (23 July 2011)
 Olivier Mony - Du beau monde on YouTube

21st-century French non-fiction writers
French literary critics
1966 births
Writers from Bordeaux
Living people